St. Mary's Catholic College Casino is a co-educational Catholic secondary school in Casino, New South Wales, Australia. It was founded by the Marist Brothers in 1946. In a list published in 2017 by the New South Wales Board of Studies of the 888 schools in the state with the best Higher School Certificate performance, the college was in 560th place, down from 396th in the previous year.

Enrolment is approximately 368 students. The school offers many courses.

In 2016, St. Mary's Rocketry team took first place in the Australian Youth Rocketry Challenge. In 2017 the school was allotted a place on the Australian and New Zealand Army Corps memorial tour.

References  

Marist Brothers schools
Catholic schools in New South Wales 
Educational institutions established in 1946
1946 establishments in Australia